Nadavaramba School is a government school in Thrissur in the Indian state of Kerala.

History 
Nadavaramba School was opened as a Lower Secondary School in 1920 by C.S. Viswanatha Iyer, who became the first Headmaster.

In 1932, the school was taken over by the Department of Education. In 1974 the Department of Education recognized Nadavaramba School as a Model School.

Facilities 

Facilities at the school include dedicated laboratories for Physics, Chemistry, Botany, Zoology, Computer Science and Geography. The school maintains a projector room with a slide projector, an overhead projector and a computer system.

The school provides coaching for football. In 2007 the school football team won the ‘Subrato Tournament 2007’.

Curriculum 

All courses taught are as per the curriculum of the Kerala Department of Education. Nadavaramb School offers the following syllabus:

 Science Group – Physics, Chemistry, Maths, Biology
 Commerce Group – Business Studies, Accountancy, Computer Application, Economics
 Humanities group – History, Geography, Political Science, Economics
 Part I: English
 Part II: second Language: Malayalam, Hindi or Sanskrit

Courses last for two years.

Enrollment requires a pass in SSLC or equivalent.

Maximum age is 20 years.

Clubs 

Nadavaramba School has multiple clubs: Environmental Club, Science Club, Maths Club, Social Science Club, Tourism Club, Literary Club, National Service Scheme, Anti-Alcoholic Club, Career Guidance and Counseling Club and Entrepreneurial Development Club.

Nadavaramba School makes it a priority to maintain proper hygiene.

Nadavaramba School observes one period in each week as ‘Dry Day’.

Waste is segregated into organic and inorganic categories. Those that cannot be recycled are incinerated.

References 

Schools in Thrissur
Irinjalakuda